Safe in Sound is a 2005 studio album by pop singer-songwriter Jim Boggia. 
A track from the album, Live the Proof was featured in an ad for the 2008 BlackBerry campaign.

Track listing
 "Shine" (Jim Boggia, Michael Aharon) – 3:43
 "Live the Proof" (Boggia, Julian Coryell) – 3:49
 "Show My Face Around" (Boggia) – 5:24
 "Underground" (Boggia) – 3:36
 "Where's The Party" (Boggia) – 6:38
 "Once" (Boggia) – 4:05
 "Made Me So Happy" (Boggia) – 3:08
 "Talk About the Weather" (Boggia) – 2:51
 "Let Me Believe (Evan's Lament)" (Boggia, Emitt Rhodes, P. Donnelly) – 4:08
 "Final Word" (Boggia) – 3:21
 "Slowly" (Boggia) – 6:08
 "Supergirl" (Boggia) – 3:18
Rainy Day in Manayunk (Hidden track)

References

2005 albums
Jim Boggia albums